Francesco, Prince Ruspoli, 3rd Prince of Cerveteri, 3rd Marquis of Riano, 8th Count of Vignanello (February 19, 1752 – March 8, 1829) was the 3rd Prince of Cerveteri, 3rd Marquis of Riano and 8th Count of Vignanello, son of Alessandro Ruspoli, 2nd Prince of Cerveteri and second wife and first cousin Prudenza dei Conti Marescotti-Capizucchi. His uncle was Bartolomeo Ruspoli.

In 1792  he was created Prince of the Holy Roman Empire both he and his male descendants, by the Emperor Francis II.

Marriages and children
He married firstly in 1781 Maria Isabella Giustiniani dei Principi di Bassano (Rome, November 8, 1763 – 1783), without issue.

He married secondly on April 19, 1784 HSH Countess Maria Leopoldina von Khevenhüller-Metsch (August 22, 1764 – February 24, 1845), by whom he had seven children:

Alessandro Ruspoli, 4th Prince of Cerveteri (ancestor of the Line I of the Princes Ruspoli)
Don Sigismondo dei Principi Ruspoli (1787 – May 11, 1849), married firstly Faustina, Contessa Tomassini (? – 1832), by whom he had a son, and secondly Paola Bellinzoni (Rome, August 28, 1819 – Rome, March 29, 1892), by whom he had a son:
Don Enrico dei Principi Ruspoli (1832 – November 20, 1869), married Emilia de Pasqualis (Athens, September 7, 1834 – ca 1895), and had five children:
Don Romolo dei Principi Ruspoli (Rome, July 19, 1850 – September 10, 1912), married in Paris, November 23, 1881, Julie Peynaud (October 20, 1838 – August, 1884), without issue
Don Orazio dei Principi Ruspoli (Rome, December 24, 1852 – ?), unmarried and without issue
Don Sigismondo dei Principi Ruspoli (Rome, June 5, 1854 – 1911), married at Livorno, September 30, 1872, Zelinda Lavagna, without issue
Donna Virginia dei Principi Ruspoli (Rome, May 5, 1855 – 1911), married on April 15, 1878, Giovanni Scaletta
Donna Beatrice dei Principi Ruspoli (Rome, April 29, 1864 – 1911), married on January 8, 1888, in Rome, Filippo Marchese Buccico della Conca, with issue
Don Leopoldo dei Principi Ruspoli (Rome, June 5, 1847 – Genazzano, January 2, 1932), unmarried and without issue
Camillo Ruspoli, Duke of Sueca (ancestor of the Line II of the Princes Ruspoli)
Donna Amalia dei Principi Ruspoli (July 30, 1790 – 1867), married Vincenzo, Conte Pianciani
Don Leopoldo dei Principi Ruspoli (1791 – September 27, 1817), unmarried and without issue
Don Emanuele dei Principi Ruspoli (1794–1837), married Adélaïde Giraud (? – 1835), without issue
Bartolomeo Ruspoli and Khevenhüller-Metsch (ancestor of the Line III of the Princes Ruspoli)

See also
Ruspoli

References

External links
Francesco Ruspoli on a genealogical site

1752 births
1829 deaths
Knights of the Golden Fleece
Francesco
Francesco
Place of birth missing